American Idols Live! Tour 2003 was a concert tour featuring 9 of the top 12 contestants of the second season of American Idol, which aired in 2003. It began on July 8, 2003, St. Paul, Minnesota and finished on August 31, 2003, in Anaheim,  California. Josh Gracin was unable to participate in the tour as he was recalled to his unit in the U.S. Marines, and Corey Clark was barred from participating due to his failure to reveal his Misdemeanor arrest. Corey Clark was replaced by Charles Grigsby for the tour, but the show producers opted not to replace Josh Gracin with twelfth-placed finisher Vanessa Olivarez.

Following the success of the first concert tour of 2002, the tour was expanded to 41 dates, including a stop in Canada. The tour was sponsored by Kellogg's Pop-Tarts.

Performers

Show overview
The show had the similar structure as that of the previous season, with the first half being entirely solos performed by contestants in elimination order, and the second half consisting of performances in groups and some solos.  There was however more varied ensemble singing with a number of duets and a few trios introduced.

Setlist
 Charles Grigsby – "Do I Do" (Stevie Wonder)
 Julia DeMato – "Beautiful" (Christina Aguilera)
 Rickey Smith – "The Way You Make Me Feel" (Michael Jackson)
 Kimberly Caldwell – "Stuck" (Stacie Orrico)
 Carmen Rasmusen – "Up!" (Shania Twain)
 Trenyce – "Proud Mary" (Tina Turner)
 Kimberley Locke – "Band of Gold" (Freda Payne)
 Clay Aiken – "This is the Night" (Clay Aiken)
 Ruben Studdard – "Superstar" (The Carpenters), "Never Too Much" (Luther Vandross)

Intermission
 Guys – "The Lady Is a Tramp" (Frank Sinatra)
 Girls – "Bootylicious" (Destiny's Child)
 Studdard and Aiken – "The Girl is Mine" (Michael Jackson/Paul McCartney)
 Locke – "Inseparable" (Natalie Cole)
 Group – Bee Gees medley – "Jive Talkin'" (Grigsby), "Stayin' Alive" (Smith), "How Deep Is Your Love" (Grigsby, Smith, Aiken), "To Love Somebody" (Aiken), "Emotion" (DeMato, Caldwell, Rasmussen, Trenyce), "If I Can't Have You" (Locke), "Nights on Broadway" (Studdard), "Night Fever" (Group), "You Should Be Dancing" (Group)
 Studdard – "Can I Get Your Attention" (Ruben Studdard) or "No Ruben" (Ruben Studdard)
 Grigsby and Smith – "Let's Go Crazy" (Prince)
 Rasmusen (with Grigsby and Smith) – "Let's Hear It for the Boy" (Deniece Williams)
 Aiken – "Can You Feel the Love Tonight" (Elton John)
 Locke – "Over the Rainbow" (Judy Garland)
 Caldwell (with Rasmusen and DeMato) – "Feel Good Time" (Pink)
 Smith and DeMato – "If I Never Met You"
 Trenyce – "I Have Nothing" (Whitney Houston)
 Girls – "I'm Every Woman" (Chaka Khan)
 Studdard and Locke – "The Best Things in Life Are Free" (Luther Vandross and Janet Jackson)
 Group – "(I've Had) The Time of My Life" (Bill Medley and Jennifer Warnes)
 Aiken – "Invisible" (D-Side)
 Studdard – "Flying Without Wings" (Westlife)
 Studdard, Aiken and Locke – "Imagine" (John Lennon)
 Group – "God Bless the U.S.A." (Lee Greenwood)

Additional notes
 Ruben Studdard performed either "Can I Get Your Attention" or "No Ruben" at different shows.

Tour dates

Response
This tour was an even greater success than the first one with sell-out shows in many cities.  In total 411,005 tickets were sold, yielding a gross total of $15,977,802 as reported by Billboard, nearly doubling that of Season 1 tour.

Tour summary
 Number of shows – 41 (19 sold out)
 Total gross – $15,977,802
 Total attendance – 411,005
 Average attendance – 10,025 (85%)
 Average ticket price – $38.87
 Highest gross – Detroit, Michigan – $545,543
 Lowest gross – Boise, Idaho – $121,455
 Highest attendance – Charlotte, North Carolina – 14,645 (100%)
 Lowest attendance – Boise, Idaho – 2,905 (41.5%)

References

American Idol concert tours
2003 concert tours